The film industry is built upon many technologies and techniques, drawing upon photography, stagecraft, music, and many other disciplines. Following is an index of specific terminology applicable thereto.

0-9
180 degree rule
- 30 degree rule

A
A and B editing
- A roll
- Accelerated montage
- Acousmatic
- Action axis
- Aerial shot
- Ambient light
- American night
- American shot
- Anamorphic
- Angle of view
- Angle plus angle
- Angular resolution
- Answer print
- Aperture
- Apple box
- Artificial light
- ASA speed rating
- Aspect ratio
- Autofocus
- Automated dialogue replacement
- Available light
- Axial cut

B
B roll
- Baby plates
- Backlot
- Background lighting
- Balloon light
- Barn doors (lighting)
- Below the line (film production)
- Best boy
- Blocking
- Bluescreen
- Boom shot
- Boomerang (lighting)
- Bounce board
- Brightness (lighting)
- Broadside (lighting)
- Butterfly (lighting)

C
C-Stand
- Callier effect
- Cameo lighting
- Cameo (credits image)
- Cameo role
- Cameo shot
- Camera angle
- Camera boom
- Camera crane
- Camera dolly
- Camera shot
- Candles per square foot
- Character animation
- Choker shot
- Chroma key
- Chromatic aberration
- CinemaDNG
- Clapboard
- Clock wipe
- Close shot
- Close up shot
- Cold open
- Color conversion filter
- Color corrected fluorescent light
- Color correction
- Color gel
- Color grading
- Color rendering index
- Color reversal internegative
- Color temperature
- Color timer
- Continuity
- Cooke Triplet lens
- Crafts service
- Crane shot
- Creative geography
- Cross cutting
- Cutaway
- Cut in - cut out
- Cutting on action

D
Daily rushes
- Day for night
- Deadspot (lighting)
- Deep focus
- Depth of field
- Depth of focus
- Dichroic lens
- Diegetic sound
- Diffraction
- Diffuser (lighting)
- Digital audio
- Digital audio tape recorder
- Digital cinema
- Digital compositing
- Digital film
- Digital image processing
- Digital intermediate
- Digital negative
- Digital projection
- Dimmer (lighting)
- Dissolve (film)
- DMX (lighting)
- Dolly grip
- Dolly shot
- Dolly zoom
- Double-system recording
- Douser (lighting)
- DPX film format
- Drawn on film animation
- Dubbing
- Dutch angle
- Dynamic composition

E
Effects light
- Electrotachyscope
- Ellipsoidal reflector spot light
- Establishing shot
- Extreme close-up
- Extreme long shot
- Eye-level camera angle

F
F-number
- F-stop
- Fade-in
- Fade-out
- Fast cutting
- Fast motion
- Feature length
- Field of view
- Fill light
- Film gate
- Film modification
- Film plane
- Film recorder
- Film scanner
- Film speed
- Filter (photography)
- Fine cut
- Fisheye lens
- Flicker fusion threshold
- Focal length
- Focus (optics)
- Focus puller
- Foley artist
- Follow focus
- Follow shot
- Followspot light
- Forced perspective
- Footage
- Fourth wall
- Frame
- Frame composition
- Frame rate
- Freeze frame shot
- Fresnel lens
- Full frame
- Full shot

G
Gobo (lighting)
- Go motion
- Godspot effect
- Greenlight
- Grip
- Gaffer

H
Hard light
- Head-on shot
- Heart wipe
- High-angle shot
- High camera angle
- High concept
- High-intensity discharge lamp
- High-key lighting
- Hip hop montage
- Hydrargyrum Medium-Arc Iodide lamp

K
Key Grip
- key light

L
letterbox
- light reflector

M
Martini Shot
- Mise en scène
- montage
- MOS
- movement mechanism
- movie camera
- MIDI Timecode

N
negative cutting

O
overcranking

P
pan and scan
- persistence of vision
- Pillarboxing
- POV shot
- point of view
- post-production

R
Reel
- Replay

S
slow cutting
- slow motion
- stand-in
- storyboard

T
take
- timecode
- time-lapse
- tracking shot

U-Z
undercranking
- voice artist
- voice-over
- widescreen

Internet 
 Le Cinédico multi-lingual lexicon on the theme of cinematographic and audiovisual techniques

See also
 Film technique
 Film crew
 Filming production roles
 List of film formats
 List of film topics
 List of basic film topics

 
Wikipedia indexes